Rebekah Robinson (born 23 January 1995) is a Jamaican netball player. She was part of the Jamaican squad that won bronze at the 2018 Commonwealth Games.

References

External links
 

1995 births
Living people
Jamaican netball players
Place of birth missing (living people)
Netball players at the 2018 Commonwealth Games
Commonwealth Games bronze medallists for Jamaica
Commonwealth Games medallists in netball
2019 Netball World Cup players
Netball Superleague players
Celtic Dragons players
Jamaican expatriate sportspeople in Wales
Medallists at the 2018 Commonwealth Games
Medallists at the 2022 Commonwealth Games